Emmanuel Chukwuemeka Ejekwu, known as Mr Funny or Oga Sabinus, is a Nigerian comedian, actor and skit maker. Born in  Port Harcourt

Early life 
Born in Port Harcourt, Rivers State, Mr Funny had his early education in Port Harcourt and went on to acquire his Bachelor's Degree in Linguistics and Communication Studies from the University of Port Harcourt.

Career 
Mr Funny's career started in 2015 but he began to see mainstream success in 2019. He was nominated in the 2021 maiden edition of The Humor Awards Academy alongside fellow comedian Basketmouth. Mr Funny discovered his comedy talent at a young age. He began actively doing comedy skits while he was in university.

This was in 2015 during a particular School Student Union week. Mr Funny decided to pursue his career further by uploading various comedy skits on his social media handles, especially Instagram.

Soon enough, he started getting noticed by top Instagram influencers who started sharing his skits. His followers on the platform grew.

Mr. Funny broke into the comedy industry in 2019.

His popularity has earned some notable recognition. Oga Sabinus is the brand ambassador for a popular betting site: Oddstackr and many others. Some of his role models who have influenced him in his comedy career are Mr Ibu and Charles Inojie.

Mr Funny has also featured in multiple Nollywood movies, the likes of 'Billionaire's Bride', 'Man of War' etc.

In May 2022, Mr Funny sued two Nigerian food companies for allegedly using his image and catchphrases without his permission. Specifically Friesland Food allegedly used the trademarked phrase "something hoodge" to advertise their Peak Milk product; while UAC used an animated image of Mr Funny in ads.
On the 30th of September 2022, Mr.Funny popularly known as investor Sabinus/Sabinus held his first london show at the light house event center.

Awards

References 

Living people
Nigerian male comedians
People from Port Harcourt
University of Port Harcourt alumni
1995 births